Henrik Ibsen (1828–1906) was a Norwegian playwright, theatre director, and poet.

Ibsen may also refer to:

People
Ibsen (name), a surname and given name, including a list of people with that name

Places
Lake Ibsen, a small lake near Leeds in Benson County, North Dakota, U.S.
Lake Ibsen Township, Benson County, North Dakota
Ibsen (crater), on the planet Mercury

Other uses
Ibsen Museum (Oslo), Norway, a museum occupying the last home of Henrik Ibsen
International Ibsen Award, a Norwegian government award for drama and theatre
Norwegian Ibsen Award, an award from Ibsen's hometown to playwrights
Ibsen Studies, a peer-reviewed academic journal

See also
Ebsen, a name
Jepsen, a name